Gerbrand Ceder is a Belgian-American scientist who is the Daniel M. Tellep Distinguished Professor of Materials Science and Engineering at University of California, Berkeley. He is notable for his pioneering research in high-throughput computational materials design, and in the development of novel lithium-ion battery technologies. He is co-founder of the Materials Project, an open-source online database of ab initio calculated material properties, which inspired the Materials Genome Initiative by the Obama administration in 2011. He is also the Founder and CTO of Pellion Technologies (previously CEO), which aims to commercialize magnesium-ion batteries. In 2017 Gerbrand Ceder was elected a member of the National Academy of Engineering, "For the development of practical computational materials design and its application to the improvement of energy storage technology."

Career
Gerbrand Ceder received an engineering degree in Metallurgy and Applied Materials Science from the University of Leuven, Belgium, in 1988, and a Ph.D. in Materials Science from the University of California at Berkeley in 1991 at which time he joined the faculty at Massachusetts Institute of Technology (MIT). He was the R.P. Simmons Professor of Materials Science and Engineering at the Massachusetts Institute of Technology for 25 years, after which he moved back to the U. C. Berkeley, where he remains. His research group focuses on the use of computational modeling to design novel materials for energy generation and storage, including battery cathodes, hydrogen storage materials, thermoelectrics, and electrodes for solar photoelectrochemical water-splitters. His group also designs, synthesizes and characterizes novel lithium-ion and sodium-ion battery chemistries. He has published over 400 scientific papers in the fields of alloy theory, oxide phase stability, high-temperature superconductors, Li-battery materials, machine learning, and theory of materials synthesis, and holds 25 current or pending U.S. patents.

In 2009, ByungWoo Kang and Gerbrand Ceder demonstrated that the lithium ion battery cathode material LiFePO4 could undergo ultrafast charging and discharging (~10 sec full discharge).

Awards 
In 2009, he was awarded the Materials Research Society (MRS) Gold Medal "For pioneering the high-impact field of first-principles thermodynamics of batteries materials and for the development of high-power density Li battery compounds". In 2015 he was made a Fellow of the Materials Research Society "For the conception and development of the Materials Genome Project, highlighting the benefits and applications of first-principles modeling, and accelerating rational design and iteration of materials for energy". He was awarded the Materials Research Society (MRS) 2016 Theory Award and the 2017 International Battery Award in Research. Gerbrand Ceder was elected to the National Academy of Engineering 2017, "For the development of practical computational materials design and its application to the improvement of energy storage technology".

He has also received the Battery Research Award from the Electrochemical Society, a CAREER Award from the National Science Foundation, and the Robert Lansing Hardy Award from The Minerals, Metals & Materials Society for "exceptional promise for a successful career".

As a faculty member at MIT he taught 3.320 Atomistic Computer Modeling of Materials, which is available freely online via MIT OpenCourseWare and YouTube. He has won multiple graduate school teaching awards from MIT.

See also
 Materials informatics

References

External links
 The MaterialsProject
 Ceder Group Website
 Keynote Talk on Materials Genome Initiative
 Scientific American Article "The Stuff of Dreams" on Computational Materials Design
 Can an idea from MIT save US manufacturing? Boston Globe article

American materials scientists
21st-century American engineers
American science writers
Old University of Leuven alumni
UC Berkeley College of Engineering alumni
MIT School of Engineering faculty
Living people
American chief executives
American chief technology officers
Year of birth missing (living people)
21st-century Belgian scientists
21st-century Belgian engineers
Belgian emigrants to the United States
Fellows of the American Physical Society
Fellows of the Minerals, Metals & Materials Society